The Scarab Murder Case (1929) is a classic whodunit written by S. S. Van Dine. In this book, detective Philo Vance's murder investigation takes place in a private home that doubles as a museum of Egyptology, and the solution depends in part on Vance's extensive knowledge of Egyptian history and customs, which enable him to sort through suggestions of godly vengeance and reveal the misdirections perpetrated by the real murderer.

Literary significance and criticism
Some reviewers "were disgusted by the author's bland insults to the reader's intelligence -- e.g., the heavy Egyptian statue in the gallery, upended on a piece of pencil and conveniently toppling on the designed victim. By that date they were fed up with the whole bag of tricks, which successive settings did not rejuvenate."

Film adaptation
The Scarab Murder Case (1936) starred Wilfrid Hyde-White as Vance.

References

External links
 
Text of the novel from Project Gutenberg, Australia
Reviewed by Mary Reed on the Mystery*File blog.

1929 American novels
American novels adapted into films
Novels by S. S. Van Dine
Ernest Benn Limited books
Charles Scribner's Sons books
Philo Vance novels